Dentipratulum is a genus of fungi in the family Hericiaceae. It was circumscribed by Dutch mycologist Marinus Anton Donk in 1962. Species in the genus have membranous fruit bodies that are either completely resupinate or effuso-reflexed (stretched out flat on the substrate but turned up at the edges). The hymenium (spore-bearing surface) bears "teeth".

Species
Dentipellis acystidiata
Dentipellis coniferarum
Dentipellis dissita
Dentipellis echinospora
Dentipellis fragilis
Dentipellis isidioides
Dentipellis macrodon
Dentipellis microspora
Dentipellis parmastoi
Dentipellis separans
Dentipellis subseparans

References

Russulales
Russulales genera